Louisiana elected its member July 3–5, 1820.

See also 
 1820 and 1821 United States House of Representatives elections
 List of United States representatives from Louisiana

1820
Louisiana
United States House of Representatives